Argalista rosea is a species of small sea snail with calcareous opercula, a marine gastropod mollusk in the family Colloniidae.

References

External links
 To World Register of Marine Species

Colloniidae
Gastropods described in 1876